Boutheïna Amiche (born 12 September 1990) is a Tunisian handball player for ASF Sfax and the Tunisian national team.

She participated at the 2015 World Women's Handball Championship.

References

External links
 
 

1990 births
Living people
Tunisian female handball players
Place of birth missing (living people)